TSS Sambur was a cargo vessel built for the Great Western Railway in 1925.

History

TSS Sambur was built by Swan Hunter and Wigham Richardson as one of a pair of new cargo vessels, the other being TSS Roebuck, and launched in 1925. She was put to work on freight services between the Channel Islands and Weymouth.

in June 1940 she was sent with her sister ship Roebuck to Saint-Valery-en-Caux to assist in the evacuation of the 51st Highland Division.  However, by the time they arrived the Germans were already in control of the port and both ships were damaged by gunfire. Subsequently she was requisitioned by the Admiralty for work as a barrage balloon ship in the River Thames and English Channel. In 1942 she was renamed Toreador. She returned to railway service after the war and resumed operation at Weymouth in September 1945  and in 1948 was taken over by British Railways.

She was scrapped in 1964.

References

1925 ships
Passenger ships of the United Kingdom
Steamships of the United Kingdom
Ships built on the River Tyne
Ships of the Great Western Railway
Ships of British Rail